Club de Fútbol Indios de Ciudad Juárez, commonly referred as Indios de Ciudad Juárez or simply Indios, was a Mexican football club. Founded in 2005 when CF Pachuca moved its Pachuca Juniors to Ciudad Juárez, it was promoted to the Primera División de México after the 2007–2008 season, with Pachuca divesting its shares upon promotion. However, the team was relegated back to the Liga de Ascenso following the 2010 Clausura and folded in 2016.

Overview 

During its time in Mexico's second-tier football league, the Primera División A Indios enjoyed much success.

In Clausura 2006, Indios played in the league final and lost to Querétaro F.C. on penalty kicks, narrowly missing promotion.

In Apertura 2006, Indios led a part of the competition with Jair García as the second-best scorer in the league. However, Indios lost in the quarterfinals. Puebla would go on to beat Petroleros de Salamanca for the title and later would win promotion to the first division with a victory over Dorados.

On December 12, 2007, the first leg of the Apertura 2007 final took place in Ciudad Juárez, Chihuahua, where Indios defeated Dorados, 3–0. The second leg took place December 15, 2007, in Culiacán, Sinaloa, where Indios defeated Dorados 4-0. This game made Indios league champions for the first time and clinched a spot in the promotion series. León took the Clausura 2008 title, setting up a two-legged "Final de Ascenso" to decide promotion. Indios won the first leg, 1–0, at home on May 22 and earned a 2–2 draw at León on May 25, giving them a 3–2 aggregate victory and promotion to the first division.

The club's first season in the first division began with the Apertura 2008 tournament.

Primera División
Indios de Ciudad Juárez started the Apertura 2008 poorly, losing their first four matches. After manager Sergio Orduna was fired, Hector Eugui took over as manager and tied his first game with Toluca.

Due to Mexico's unique system of relegation, Indios were on the brink of being relegated during the Clausura 2009 tournament despite having a winning season and qualifying as 7th place for the playoffs. In the playoffs, Indios stunned 2nd-seeded, defending champion Toluca, 1–0 on aggregate before falling to top-seeded Pachuca by a 4–3 count.

In the Apertura 2009 tournament, Indios failed to win a single match, managing just six draws in seventeen matches while being outscored 26–7. Indios improved in the Torneo Bicentenario, but their four victories left them far short of safety. On April 25, 2010, Indios said goodbye to the Mexican 1st division with a 2-0 victory win at home over Pumas UNAM.

Return to Liga de Ascenso and Disappearance
During the opening half of the 2010–11 Liga de Ascenso season, Juárez finished second to Club Tijuana during the classification phase. However, they were upset by Albinegros de Orizaba in the playoffs. In the Clausura season, they finished tenth and outside of playoff contention. Indios finished 13th and eight points out of the playoffs during their final season.

At the end of the 2011 season, the club had many financial problems. Femexfut announced in December 2011 that the club was being disbanded.

Reappearance as Indios UACJ
After the disaffiliation of Club Indios de Ciudad Juarez, Ciudad Juárez was left without a professional soccer team. After failed attempts to maintain a team of professional soccer for this border was the UACJ, which assumed that leadership, joining other universities that have professional football teams.

Therefore, in May 2012, Francisco Javier Sánchez Carlos, rector of the UACJ, announced the integrated to the Segunda División de México of Mexican Soccer as Club de Fútbol Indios de la UACJ. Their official match was on August 18 with a 1–3 loss to Coras de Tepic correspond to Group 1 Liga Premier, which currently plays.

On May 10, 2014, Indios UACJ won the Liguilla de Copa Clausura 2014 for the first time and also making history. Indios UACJ defeated Irapuato in Final Clausura 2014 in penalty kicks with a big save from the goalkeeper, gets this important fact for the Juarez institution.

Their major rival was Dorados de la UACH, for which the classic was called "El Clásico del Norte".

Stadium

Indios UACJ played their home matches at the Estadio Olímpico Benito Juárez in Ciudad Juárez, Chihuahua. The stadium capacity is 23,500 people. It is owned by Universidad Autónoma de Ciudad Juárez, and its surface is natural grass. The stadium was opened in October 1980 with a match between Mexico national football team and Atlético Español.

Managers

Indios de Ciudad Juarez

Indios UACJ

Competitive record

Overall statistics

General statistics
All-time top scorer: Julio Daniel Frías 30 goals (23 in Primera "A" / 7 in Primera División)
Most appearances: Edwin Santibáñez with 150 matches (114 in Primera "A" / 36 in Primera División)
Most minutes played: Edwin Santibáñez with 12,416 minutes (9, 385 in Primera "A" / 3031 in Primera División)
Most yellow cards: Edwin Santibáñez 39 (32 in Primera "A" / 7 in Primera División)
Most red cards: Ricardo Esqueda 4 (3 in Primera "A" / 1 in Primera División), Julio Brian Gutierrez (4)
Most games played as captain: Edwin Santibáñez with 89 matches (55 in Primera "A" / 34 in Primera División)
Primera "A": 2005-08 (Regular season / Repechaje / Liguilla / Juego de Ascenso)
Primera División: 2008-09 (Regular season / Liguilla)

Milestone goals

Honours
Primera Division A: 1
Apertura 2007 (as Indios de Ciudad Juarez)

Segunda Division -- Liguilla de Copa: 1
Clausura 2014 (as Indios UACJ)

See also
 Indios de Ciudad Juárez Reserves

References

External links
 Results and scorers at RSSSF
 Official Site

Notes
 

 
Football clubs in Chihuahua (state)
Sports teams in Ciudad Juárez
Ascenso MX teams
2005 establishments in Mexico
Liga MX teams